Sir William Oldnall Russell (1785– 22 January 1833) was the Chief Justice of the Surpreme Court at Calcuta.

Life
He was born in 1785, the eldest son of Samuel Oldnall, rector of St. Nicholas, Worcester, and North Piddle, and Mary, daughter of William Russell of Powick. In 1816, in accordance with the will of his maternal grandfather, he took the surname of Russell. He matriculated at Christ Church, Oxford, on 22 December 1801, and was a student till 1812. He graduated B.A. in 1804 and M.A. in 1807. He was called to the bar at Lincoln's Inn in 1809, became serjeant-at-law on 25 June 1827, and Chief Justice of Bengal in 1832, when he was knighted.

Russell died on 22 January 1833. He had married, in 1825, Louisa Maria, daughter of John Lloyd Williams, and left children.

Works
Russell's Treatise on Crimes and Misdemeanours, which appeared in 2 vols. in 1819, was pronounced by Samuel Warren "the best general treatise in criminal law". A second edition appeared in 1827; a third, edited by C. S. Greaves, in 1843, with a supplement in 1851; a fourth, in 3 vols., in 1865; and a fifth, edited by S. Prentice, Q.C., in 1877. The American editions, of which seven were issued between 1824 and 1853, did not reproduce the whole work.

Russell also published:

Practice in the Court of Great Sessions on the Caermarthen Circuit ... also the Mode of levying a Fine and of suffering a Recovery ... To which are added Rules of that Circuit, and some Precedents of Practical Forms, 3 pts., 1814.
With (Sir) Edward Ryan, Crown Cases reserved and decided by Twelve Judges of England, 1799-1824, 1825; republished in John William Wallace's British Crown Cases reserved.

References

Adams, John N. "Russell, Sir William Oldnall". In A. W. B. Simpson. Biographical Dictionary of the Common Law. Butterworths. 1984. pp. 456 - 457.

Allibone, S Austin. "Russell, Sir William Oldnall". A Critical Dictionary of English Literature and British and American Authors. Philadelphia. 1874. Volume 2. Page 1902.
"Some Account of the Life and Writings of Sir Wm Russell" (1833) 6 The Legal Observer 225 (27 July 1833)
George K Stanton. Rambles and Researches Among Worcestershire Churches. Simpkin, Marshall & Co. London. Messenger Printing and Publishing Company. Bromsgrove. Pages 114 and 117.
(1944) 88 Solicitors Journal 222
Glyn Parry. A Guide to the Records of Great Sessions in Wales. National Library of Wales. 1995.
Rhys and Brynmor-Jones. The Welsh People. Second Edition. New York. 1900. Pages 375 and 384. Fifth Edition. Unwin. 1909. Pages 375 and 384.
Russell. The Practice of the Court of Great Sessions on the Carmarthen Circuit. 1814.
Russell. A Short Sketch of the Origin and History of the Welsh Jurisdiction. 1816.
Russell and Ryan. Crown Cases Reserved for Consideration. (Russell and Ryan's Crown Cases; Russell and Ryan's Reports). London, 1825. Philadelphia, 1839.

1785 births
1833 deaths
Alumni of Christ Church, Oxford
Members of Lincoln's Inn
Serjeants-at-law (England)
British India judges
19th-century English lawyers
British people in colonial India